"Allt fyrir ástina" (All in the Name of Love) is an album by Icelandic pop singer and disc jockey Páll Óskar, released on November 7, 2007.

Track listing

Singles

References 

2007 albums